The 2010 Toulon Tournament was the 38th edition of the Toulon Tournament and began on 18 May and ended on 27 May 2010. Chile were the defending champions.

Participant teams

Venues
The matches were played in these communes:
Aubagne
Hyères
La Seyne
Le Lavandou
Nice
Toulon

Squads

Results

Group A

All times local (CEST)

Group B

All times local (CEST)

Knockout stage

Semifinals

Third place play-off

Final

Goal scorers
5 goals
 Nicki Bille Nielsen
4 goals
 Lynel Kitambala
3 goals
 Gerard Bi Goua Gohou
 Hassan Al Haidos
2 goals

 Edouard Butin
 Marco Medel
 Carlos Muñoz
 Emil Lyng
 Serge Déblé
 Yannick Sagbo

1 goal

 Thibaut Bourgeois
 Yacine Brahimi
 Mathieu Dossevi
 Magaye Gueye
 Loïc Nestor
 Morgan Schneiderlin
 Juan Abarca
 Gerson Martínez
 Eugenio Mena
 Luis Pavez
 Matías Rubio
 Sebastián Toro
 Sebastián Ubilla
 Javier Calle
 Edwin Cardona
 Luis Muriel
 Andreas Bjelland
 Henrik Dalsgaard
 Mads Jessen
 Patrick Mortensen
 Yannick Boli
 Moustapha Ouedraogo
 Bakary Saré
 Giovanni Sio
 Shunya Suganuma
 Ali Yahya
 Pavel Mamayev
 Alexander Sapeta
 Fedor Smolov

Own goal
 Lamine Koné (for Denmark)
 Anton Vlasov (for Qatar)

External links
Toulon Tournament

 
2010
2009–10 in French football
2010 in youth association football
May 2010 sports events in France